Markus Arthur Germann (born 9 May 1942) is a Swiss figure skater. He is the 1963 & 1964 Swiss national champion. He represented Switzerland at the 1964 Winter Olympics where he placed 19th.

He has served as an ISU Referee for Switzerland.

Competitive highlights

References

External links
 
 List of Historical Swiss Champions

1942 births
Living people
Swiss male single skaters
Olympic figure skaters of Switzerland
Figure skaters at the 1964 Winter Olympics
Figure skating officials